These quarterbacks have started at least one game for the New York Giants of the National Football League. They are listed in order of the date of each player's first start at quarterback for the Giants.

Regular season

The number of games they started during the season is listed to the right:

Notes:

 Due to the 1982 Players' strike, only nine games were played in the 1982 season.

Postseason 

 * - Prior to 1933, the NFL Championship was won by the team with the best win–loss record in the regular season.

Team Career Passing Records 
(Through the 2022 NFL Season)

See also
 Lists of NFL starting quarterbacks

References
 Pro-Football Reference

New York Giants

quarterbacks